Kondol is a rural locality (a selo) and the administrative center of Penzensky District, Penza Oblast, Russia. Population:

References

Notes

Sources

Rural localities in Penzensky District
Petrovsky Uyezd